Katharine Cooper Cater Hall, also known as the Old President's Mansion or the Social Center, is a structure on the National Register of Historic Places on the campus of Auburn University, in Auburn, Alabama.  Designed by Joseph Hudnut and built for $17,000, Cater Hall was constructed in 1915 as the residence for the president of Auburn University (then the Alabama Polytechnic Institute). In 1938, a new president's home was built, and the structure became the social center for the new Quad dorms when they were built to the south of the mansion in 1940. In the late 1970s, the building was renovated to contain administrative offices and today houses Auburn University's educational support services divisions.

References

Houses on the National Register of Historic Places in Alabama
Neoclassical architecture in Alabama
Houses completed in 1915
Auburn University
Houses in Lee County, Alabama
University and college buildings on the National Register of Historic Places in Alabama
National Register of Historic Places in Lee County, Alabama
University and college buildings completed in 1915
1915 establishments in Alabama